Eysenhardtia texana, commonly known as Texas kidneywood, bee-brush, or vara dulce, is a species of small flowering tree in the legume family, Fabaceae. It is found from south-central Texas south to northern San Luis Potosí in the Rio Grande Valley region of south Texas–Northeastern Mexico, and the species ranges into the eastern Chihuahuan Desert areas of Coahuila.

Distribution
The contiguous range of Texas kidneywood covers the three neighboring Mexican states of Coahuila, Nuevo Leon, and Tamaulipas in northeast Mexico, the Rio Grande valley, from Big Bend southeastwards, but not the coastal Gulf of Mexico areas, only 25–50 miles inland. Part of the range extends southwards into extreme northern San Luis Potosí, and some isolated locales towards east-central and southern Texas.

References

External links

Lady Bird Johnson database, w/ gallery
NRCS: USDA Plants Profile
Interactive Distribution Map of Eysenhardtia texana

texana
Plants described in 1848
North American desert flora
Trees of the Southwestern United States
Flora of the Rio Grande valleys
Flora of the Chihuahuan Desert
Trees of the South-Central United States
Trees of Coahuila
Trees of Nuevo León
Trees of Tamaulipas
Trees of San Luis Potosí
Flora of the Mexican Plateau